Mohamud Ali Mohamed (born 8 July 1994) is a professional footballer who plays as a centre back or defensive midfielder for Southport. Born in Holland, he represents the Somalia national team.

Club career
Ali has spent most of his youth at the highly rated academy of Alphense Boys with a short spell at ADO Den Haag playing alongside Nathan Aké. Ali made his first team debut for Alphense Boys on the 15th of April 2012 aged 18 playing in the Hoofdklasse then the third tier. Ali moved to Manchester in 2013. In 2014 Ali joined Northwich Victoria. In December 2015 Ali played in the FA Cup 2nd Round Proper against League Two opposition Northampton Town featuring Dominic Calvert-Lewin. At the beginning of the 2016/2017 season Ali joined Glossop North End midway through the season he signed for Mossley where he spent 12 months. Ali spent the last few months of the 2017/2018 season at Droylsden FC. Ali joined Curzon Ashton in the summer of 2018.

International career
He has been capped by the Somalia national team. He made his international debut on the 13th of October 2015 in the World Cup qualifiers against Niger. On 5 September 2019, he played in a 1–0 win against Zimbabwe, marking Somalia's first ever FIFA World Cup qualification victory. and was named man of the match in the team's historic World Cup match against Zimbabwe in September 2019, when the country recorded their first win in 35 years of qualification matches.

Personal life
Ali works as a driving instructor in Manchester, England.  His brother Ahmed Ali also plays for the national team.

References

External references

1994 births
Living people
Association football central defenders
Association football midfielders
People with acquired Somali citizenship
Somalian footballers
Somalia international footballers
Northern Premier League players
Northwich Victoria F.C. players
Glossop North End A.F.C. players
Mossley A.F.C. players
Droylsden F.C. players
National League (English football) players
Curzon Ashton F.C. players
Somalian expatriate footballers
Somalian expatriate sportspeople in England
Expatriate footballers in England
Dutch footballers
Dutch people of Somali descent
ADO Den Haag players
Alphense Boys players
Dutch expatriate footballers
Dutch expatriate sportspeople in England